The 1999–2000 NBA season was the Kings' 51st season in the National Basketball Association, and 15th season in Sacramento. During the off-season, the Kings acquired Nick Anderson from the Orlando Magic, and signed free agents Tony Delk, Darrick Martin, and re-signed Tyrone Corbin. For the season opener, the Kings traveled to Tokyo, Japan to play their first two games against the Minnesota Timberwolves. Coming off a winning record in a strike-shortened season was much expected of the Kings, who got off to a fast start winning nine of their first ten games, which included an 8-game winning streak. The team held a 30–18 record at the All-Star break. However, they played below .500 for the remainder of the season losing seven of their final eight games, finishing fifth in the Pacific Division with a 44–38 record.

Chris Webber averaged 24.5 points, 10.5 rebounds, 4.6 assists, 1.6 steals and 1.7 blocks per game, and was named to the All-NBA Third Team, selected for the 2000 NBA All-Star Game, and finished in ninth place in Most Valuable Player voting, while second-year star Jason Williams averaged 12.3 points, 7.3 assists and 1.4 steals per game, and Vlade Divac provided the team with 12.3 points, 8.0 rebounds and 1.3 blocks per game. In addition, second-year forward Peja Stojaković provided with 11.9 points per game off the bench, while Anderson contributed 10.8 points per game, and Corliss Williamson provided with 10.3 points per game. Off the bench, three-point specialist Jon Barry contributed 8.0 points per game, and Scot Pollard averaged 5.4 points and 5.3 rebounds per game.

However, in the Western Conference First Round of the playoffs, the Kings lost in five games to the top-seeded and eventual champion Los Angeles Lakers. The Lakers would reach the NBA Finals to defeat the Indiana Pacers in six games.

Following the season, Williamson was traded to the Toronto Raptors, while Corbin signed as a free agent with the Raptors, and Delk signed with the Phoenix Suns.

Draft picks

Roster

Roster Notes
 Center Jerome James missed the entire season due to a knee injury.

Regular season

Season standings

z – clinched division title
y – clinched division title
x – clinched playoff spot

Record vs. opponents

Game log

|-style="background:#cfc;"
| 1
| November 5
| Minnesota
| 
| Nick Anderson (17)
| Chris Webber (15)
| Jason Williams (6)
| Tokyo Dome32,623
| 1–0
|-style="background:#fcc;"
| 2
| November 6
| @ Minnesota
| 
| Chris Webber (22)
| Chris Webber (10)
| Jason Williams (8)
| Tokyo Dome34,013
| 1–1
|-style="background:#cfc;"
| 3
| November 12
| Utah
| 
| Chris Webber (20)
| Chris Webber (9)
| Jason Williams (5)
| ARCO Arena17,317
| 2–1
|-style="background:#cfc;"
| 4
| November 14
| Denver
| 
| Chris Webber (32)
| Webber, Divac (12)
| Jason Williams (6)
| ARCO Arena15,491
| 3–1
|-style="background:#cfc;"
| 5
| November 16
| Vancouver
| 
| Chris Webber (19)
| Tyrone Corbin (10)
| Webber, Williams (4)
| ARCO Arena14,169
| 4–1
|-style="background:#cfc;"
| 6
| November 18
| @ Houston
| 
| Jason Williams (23)
| Scot Pollard (9)
| Jason Williams (10)
| Compaq Center14,898
| 5–1
|-style="background:#cfc;"
| 7
| November 19
| @ Dallas
| 
| Chris Webber (24)
| Webber, Divac (11)
| Darrick Martin (5)
| Reunion Arena15,507
| 6–1
|-style="background:#cfc;"
| 8
| November 21
| Houston
| 
| Chris Webber (28)
| Chris Webber (11)
| Jason Williams (12)
| ARCO Arena17,317
| 7–1
|-style="background:#cfc;"
| 9
| November 23
| New Jersey
| 
| Chris Webber (26)
| Chris Webber (22)
| Chris Webber (10)
| ARCO Arena17,021
| 8–1
|-style="background:#cfc;"
| 10
| November 26
| Golden State
| 
| Chris Webber (20)
| Chris Webber (9)
| Jason Williams (12)
| ARCO Arena17,317
| 9–1
|-style="background:#fcc;"
| 11
| November 29
| @ Miami
| 
| Chris Webber (18)
| Chris Webber (10)
| Jason Williams (8)
| Miami Arena14,723
| 9–2
|-style="background:#cfc;"
| 12
| November 30
| @ Orlando
| 
| Chris Webber (22)
| Anderson, Webber (11)
| Anderson, Williams (5)
| Orlando Arena14,439
| 10–2

|-style="background:#fcc;"
| 13
| December 2
| @ Atlanta
| 
| Chris Webber (26)
| Vlade Divac (11)
| Jason Williams (12)
| Philips Arena14,537
| 10–3
|-style="background:#cfc;"
| 14
| December 4
| @ Washington
| 
| Chris Webber (25)
| Chris Webber (11)
| Chris Webber (10)
| MCI Center19,220
| 11–3
|-style="background:#fcc;"
| 15
| December 6
| @ New Jersey
| 
| Chris Webber (25)
| Chris Webber (14)
| Jason Williams (7)
| Continental Airlines Arena13,127
| 11–4
|-style="background:#cfc;"
| 16
| December 8
| L.A. Lakers
| 
| Chris Webber (20)
| Chris Webber (12)
| Jason Williams (5)
| ARCO Arena17,317
| 12–4
|-style="background:#fcc;"
| 17
| December 10
| Miami
| 
| Chris Webber (26)
| Chris Webber (10)
| Jason Williams (12)
| ARCO Arena17,317
| 12–5
|-style="background:#fcc;"
| 18
| December 11
| Portland
| 
| Chris Webber (36)
| Chris Webber (12)
| Jason Williams (12)
| ARCO Arena17,317
| 12–6
|-style="background:#cfc;"
| 19
| December 15
| @ Vancouver
| 
| Chris Webber (21)
| Chris Webber (13)
| Vlade Divac (6)
| General Motors Place12,490
| 13–6
|-style="background:#fcc;"
| 20
| December 16
| @ Denver
| 
| Chris Webber (26)
| Vlade Divac (7)
| Jason Williams (7)
| Pepsi Center15,576
| 13–7
|-style="background:#fcc;"
| 21
| December 18
| @ Phoenix
| 
| Jason Williams (22)
| Vlade Divac (11)
| Jason Williams (8)
| America West Arena19,023
| 13–8
|-style="background:#fcc;"
| 22
| December 20
| @ Golden State
| 
| Corliss Williamson (24)
| Tony Delk (11)
| Jason Williams (11)
| The Arena in Oakland15,176
| 13–9
|-style="background:#cfc;"
| 23
| December 21
| Milwaukee
| 
| Jason Williams (28)
| Vlade Divac (12)
| Jason Williams (6)
| ARCO Arena17,317
| 14–9
|-style="background:#fcc;"
| 24
| December 23
| @ L.A. Clippers
| 
| Chris Webber (33)
| Corliss Williamson (11)
| Vlade Divac (8)
| Staples Center14,315
| 14–10
|-style="background:#cfc;"
| 25
| December 26
| Dallas
| 
| Chris Webber (31)
| Vlade Divac (13)
| Jason Williams (8)
| ARCO Arena17,317
| 15–10
|-style="background:#cfc;"
| 26
| December 28
| Boston
| 
| Chris Webber (23)
| Chris Webber (11)
| Jason Williams (7)
| ARCO Arena17,317
| 16–10
|-style="background:#cfc;"
| 27
| December 29
| @ Seattle
| 
| Chris Webber (31)
| Chris Webber (10)
| Darrick Martin (7)
| KeyArena17,072
| 17–10

|-style="background:#cfc;"
| 28
| January 4
| @ Cleveland
| 
| Chris Webber (37)
| Chris Webber (10)
| Jason Williams (18)
| Gund Arena14,875
| 18–10
|-style="background:#fcc;"
| 29
| January 6
| @ Toronto
| 
| Chris Webber (27)
| Chris Webber (19)
| Jason Williams (4)
| Air Canada Centre19,800
| 18–11
|-style="background:#fcc;"
| 30
| January 7
| @ Boston
| 
| Nick Anderson (24)
| Chris Webber (11)
| Jason Williams (7)
| FleetCenter18,624
| 18–12
|-style="background:#cfc;"
| 31
| January 9
| Indiana
| 
| Chris Webber (31)
| Corliss Williamson (9)
| Jason Williams (15)
| ARCO Arena17,317
| 19–12
|-style="background:#cfc;"
| 32
| January 11
| Houston
| 
| Chris Webber (26)
| Chris Webber (12)
| Jason Williams (5)
| ARCO Arena17,317
| 20–12
|-style="background:#cfc;"
| 33
| January 13
| San Antonio
| 
| Chris Webber (34)
| Chris Webber (19)
| Williams, Webber, Divac (3)
| ARCO Arena17,317
| 21–12
|-style="background:#cfc;"
| 34
| January 15
| @ Golden State
| 
| Chris Webber (37)
| Chris Webber (16)
| Jason Williams (10)
| The Arena in Oakland18,372
| 22–12
|-style="background:#cfc;"
| 35
| January 16
| Cleveland
| 
| Chris Webber (25)
| Chris Webber (11)
| Jason Williams (10)
| ARCO Arena17,317
| 23–12
|-style="background:#cfc;"
| 36
| January 18
| L.A. Clippers
| 
| Chris Webber (30)
| Vlade Divac (11)
| Jason Williams (12)
| ARCO Arena17,317
| 24–12
|-style="background:#cfc;"
| 37
| January 20
| Orlando
| 
| Divac, Stojaković (17)
| Vlade Divac (12)
| Jason Williams (8)
| ARCO Arena17,317
| 25–12
|-style="background:#fcc;"
| 38
| January 22
| Utah
| 
| Jason Williams (22)
| Vlade Divac (10)
| Jason Williams (6)
| ARCO Arena17,317
| 25–13
|-style="background:#cfc;"
| 39
| January 25
| @ Charlotte
| 
| Chris Webber (30)
| Vlade Divac (12)
| Jason Williams (9)
| Charlotte Coliseum17,370
| 26–13
|-style="background:#fcc;"
| 40
| January 26
| @ Milwaukee
| 
| Nick Anderson (24)
| Vlade Divac (12)
| Jason Williams (11)
| Bradley Center16,931
| 26–14
|-style="background:#cfc;"
| 41
| January 28
| @ Chicago
| 
| Chris Webber (24)
| Chris Webber (12)
| Jason Williams (9)
| United Center22,292
| 27–14
|-style="background:#fcc;"
| 42
| January 30
| @ New York
| 
| Chris Webber (26)
| Webber, Divac (6)
| Jason Williams (12)
| Madison Square Garden19,763
| 27–15
|-style="background:#fcc;"
| 43
| January 31
| @ Minnesota
| 
| Chris Webber (14)
| Chris Webber (7)
| Jason Williams (7)
| Target Center18,046
| 27–16

|-style="background:#cfc;"
| 44
| February 2
| @ Detroit
| 
| Chris Webber (39)
| Chris Webber (11)
| Jason Williams (11)
| The Palace of Auburn Hills20,259
| 28–16
|-style="background:#fcc;"
| 45
| February 4
| @ Indiana
| 
| Chris Webber (32)
| Chris Webber (14)
| Jason Williams (8)
| Conseco Fieldhouse18,345
| 28–17
|-style="background:#fcc;"
| 46
| February 6
| @ Philadelphia
| 
| Chris Webber (32)
| Chris Webber (14)
| Webber, Williams (7)
| First Union Center20,718
| 28–18
|-style="background:#cfc;"
| 47
| February 8
| Chicago
| 
| Chris Webber (22)
| Webber, Divac (10)
| Jason Williams (8)
| ARCO Arena17,317
| 29–18
|-style="background:#cfc;"
| 48
| February 10
| Denver
| 
| Chris Webber (22)
| Chris Webber (14)
| Jason Williams (8)
| ARCO Arena17,317
| 30–18
|-style="background:#fcc;"
| 49
| February 15
| Phoenix
| 
| Chris Webber (27)
| Chris Webber (9)
| Jason Williams (8)
| ARCO Arena17,317
| 30–19
|-style="background:#fcc;"
| 50
| February 17
| @ Utah
| 
| Chris Webber (22)
| Scot Pollard (9)
| Jason Williams (9)
| Delta Center19,911
| 30–20
|-style="background:#cfc;"
| 51
| February 18
| Seattle
| 
| Peja Stojaković (21)
| Scot Pollard (14)
| Jason Williams (7)
| ARCO Arena17,317
| 31–20
|-style="background:#fcc;"
| 52
| February 20
| Portland
| 
| Chris Webber (33)
| Chris Webber (19)
| Chris Webber (7)
| ARCO Arena17,317
| 31–21
|-style="background:#fcc;"
| 53
| February 21
| @ Denver
| 
| Peja Stojaković (30)
| Chris Webber (15)
| Jason Williams (8)
| Pepsi Center18,527
| 31–22
|-style="background:#fcc;"
| 54
| February 23
| Atlanta
| 
| Chris Webber (28)
| Chris Webber (20)
| Jason Williams (7)
| ARCO Arena17,317
| 31–23
|-style="background:#fcc;"
| 55
| February 26
| @ Vancouver
| 
| Chris Webber (36)
| Webber, Divac (10)
| Vlade Divac (7)
| General Motors Place17,856
| 31–24
|-style="background:#cfc;"
| 56
| February 29
| Vancouver
| 
| Chris Webber (23)
| Scot Pollard (10)
| Jason Williams (8)
| ARCO Arena17,317
| 32–24

|-style="background:#fcc;"
| 57
| March 2
| @ Houston
| 
| Chris Webber (29)
| Chris Webber (11)
| Jon Barry (8)
| Compaq Center15,754
| 32–25
|-style="background:#cfc;"
| 58
| March 4
| @ San Antonio
| 
| Chirs Webber (31)
| Scot Pollard (9)
| Chirs Webber (5)
| Alamodome35,113
| 33–25
|-style="background:#cfc;"
| 59
| March 6
| Dallas
| 
| Chris Webber (22)
| Webber, Divac (10)
| Chris Webber (11)
| ARCO Arena17,317
| 34–25
|-style="background:#cfc;"
| 60
| March 8
| Charlotte
| 
| Vlade Divac (27)
| Vlade Divac (11)
| Jason Williams (6)
| ARCO Arena17,317
| 35–25
|-style="background:#cfc;"
| 61
| March 10
| Toronto
| 
| Chris Webber (25)
| Chris Webber (12)
| Corliss Williamson (6)
| ARCO Arena17,317
| 36–25
|-style="background:#fcc;"
| 62
| March 12
| @ L.A. Lakers
| 
| Chris Webber (24)
| Vlade Divac (13)
| Jason Williams (8)
| Staples Center18,997
| 36–26
|-style="background:#fcc;"
| 63
| March 14
| @ Portland
| 
| Peja Stojaković (22)
| Chris Webber (11)
| Webber, Divac (5)
| Rose Garden20,499
| 36–27
|-style="background:#cfc;"
| 64
| March 15
| L.A. Clippers
| 
| Chris Webber (25)
| Vlade Divac (15)
| Webber, Divac, Williams (4)
| ARCO Arena17,317
| 37–27
|-style="background:#cfc;"
| 65
| March 18
| @ L.A. Clippers
| 
| Divac, Stojaković (20)
| Chris Webber (9)
| Chris Webber (5)
| Staples Center18,964
| 38–27
|-style="background:#cfc;"
| 66
| March 21
| Washington
| 
| Vlade Divac (24)
| Vlade Divac (12)
| Anderson, Williams (3)
| ARCO Arena17,317
| 39–27
|-style="background:#fcc;"
| 67
| March 22
| @ Phoenix
| 
| Chris Webber (16)
| Chris Webber (6)
| Jason Williams (7)
| America West Arena19,023
| 39–28
|-style="background:#cfc;"
| 68
| March 24
| Detroit
| 
| Chris Webber (29)
| Chris Webber (14)
| Jason Williams (10)
| ARCO Arena17,317
| 40–28
|-style="background:#fcc;"
| 69
| March 26
| L.A. Lakers
| 
| Chris Webber (28)
| Chris Webber (15)
| Chris Webber (8)
| ARCO Arena17,317
| 40–29
|-style="background:#cfc;"
| 70
| March 28
| New York
| 
| Chris Webber (21)
| Chris Webber (10)
| Chris Webber (11)
| ARCO Arena17,317
| 41–29
|-style="background:#fcc;"
| 71
| March 31
| @ Seattle
| 
| Chris Webber (22)
| Chris Webber (12)
| Jason Williams (10)
| KeyArena16,274
| 41–30

|-style="background:#cfc;"
| 72
| April 2
| Philadelphia
| 
| Chris Webber (26)
| Vlade Divac (11)
| Vlade Divac (11)
| ARCO Arena17,317
| 42–30
|-style="background:#fcc;"
| 73
| April 4
| @ Dallas
| 
| Corliss Williamson (20)
| Vlade Divac (10)
| Jason Williams (10)
| Reunion Arena14,029
| 42–31
|-style="background:#cfc;"
| 74
| April 5
| @ San Antonio
| 
| Corliss Williamson (28)
| Corliss Williamson (11)
| Jason Williams (8)
| Alamodome24,333
| 43–31
|-style="background:#fcc;"
| 75
| April 7
| Minnesota
| 
| Vlade Divac (20)
| Vlade Divac (12)
| Vlade Divac (9)
| ARCO Arena17,317
| 43–32
|-style="background:#fcc;"
| 76
| April 9
| Phoenix
| 
| Jason Williams (24)
| Chris Webber (13)
| Chris Webber (5)
| ARCO Arena17,317
| 43–33
|-style="background:#fcc;"
| 77
| April 11
| San Antonio
| 
| Jason Williams (17)
| Chris Webber (12)
| Jason Williams (9)
| ARCO Arena17,317
| 43–34
|-style="background:#cfc;"
| 78
| April 13
| Golden State
| 
| Chris Webber (22)
| Vlade Divac (11)
| Webber, Williams, Stojaković (5)
| ARCO Arena17,317
| 44–34
|-style="background:#fcc;"
| 79
| April 14
| @ L.A. Lakers
| 
| Chris Webber (36)
| Chris Webber (10)
| Jason Williams (9)
| Staples Center18,997
| 44–35
|-style="background:#fcc;"
| 80
| April 16
| @ Portland
| 
| Chris Webber (21)
| Vlade Divac (14)
| Chris Webber (8)
| Rose Garden20,584
| 44–36
|-style="background:#fcc;"
| 81
| April 18
| Seattle
| 
| Webber, Williams (23)
| Scot Pollard (11)
| Chris Webber (13)
| ARCO Arena17,317
| 44–37
|-style="background:#fcc;"
| 82
| April 19
| @ Utah
| 
| Darrick Martin (16)
| Divac, Wennington (10)
| Darrick Martin (4)
| Delta Center19,911
| 44–38

Playoffs

|- align="center" bgcolor="#ffcccc"
| 1
| April 23
| @ L.A. Lakers
| L 107–117
| Chris Webber (28)
| Lawrence Funderburke (6)
| Vlade Divac (8)
| Staples Center18,997
| 0–1
|- align="center" bgcolor="#ffcccc"
| 2
| April 27
| @ L.A. Lakers
| L 89–113
| Chris Webber (22)
| Chris Webber (12)
| Chris Webber (6)
| Staples Center18,997
| 0–2
|- align="center" bgcolor="#ccffcc"
| 3
| April 30
| L.A. Lakers
| W 99–91
| Chris Webber (29)
| Chris Webber (14)
| Chris Webber (8)
| ARCO Arena17,317
| 1–2
|- align="center" bgcolor="#ccffcc"
| 4
| May 2
| L.A. Lakers
| W 101–88
| Chris Webber (23)
| Chris Webber (13)
| Chris Webber (8)
| ARCO Arena17,317
| 2–2
|- align="center" bgcolor="#ffcccc"
| 5
| May 5
| @ L.A. Lakers
| L 86–113
| Chris Webber (20)
| Tony Delk (6)
| Barry, Webber (4)
| Staples Center18,997
| 2–3
|-

Player statistics

Season

Playoffs

Awards and records
 Chris Webber, All-NBA Third Team

Transactions

References

Sacramento Kings seasons
Sacramento
Sacramento
Sacramento